Esso Cadillac was an  tanker which was built in 1940 as Empire Bronze for the Ministry of War Transport (MoWT). She was sold into civil service in 1946 and renamed Esso Cadillac. Another change of ownership in 1956 saw her renamed Maribella II and she served under this name until scrapped in 1959.

Description 
Empire Bronze was built by R & W Hawthorn, Leslie & Co Ltd, Newcastle upon Tyne. She was yard number 627. Launched on 19 August 1940, she was completed in November 1940.

She was propelled by a 4-stroke Single Cycle Single Action diesel engine which had eight cylinders of  bore by  stroke. The engine was built by Hawthorn Leslie. She had a GRT of 8,149 with a NRT of 4,770.

Career 

Empire Bronze's port of registry was South Shields. She was initially operated under the management of A Weir Ltd. Empire Bronze was a member of a number of convoys during the Second World War.

HX 152
Convoy HX 152 departed Halifax, Nova Scotia on 28 September 1941 and arrived at Liverpool on 14 October. Empire Bronze was described as "an odd-looking ship".

HX 196
Convoy HX 196 departed Halifax, Nova Scotia on 29 June 1942 and arrived at Liverpool on 10 July.

In 1942, management of Empire Bronze was transferred to Anglo-American Oil Co Ltd. In 1946, the ship was sold to Anglo-American Oil and renamed Esso Cadillac. Her port of registry remained at South Shields. In 1956, Esso Cadillac was sold to Mariblanca Navigazione SA, Panama and was renamed Maribella II. She was operated under the management of Chandris (England) Ltd. Maribella II was in service until 1959, arriving at Okinawa, Japan on 14 August 1959 for scrapping by Hanwa Co Ltd.

Official Numbers and Code Letters 

Official Numbers were a forerunner to IMO Numbers. Empire Bronze and Esso Cadillac had the UK Official Number 168646 and used the Code Letters GMYV.

References

External links 
 Photos of Esso Cadillac

1940 ships
Ships built on the River Tyne
Empire ships
Ministry of War Transport ships
World War II tankers
Tankers of the United Kingdom
Tankers of Panama
Ships of ExxonMobil